The 2006–07 snooker season was a series of snooker tournaments played between 13 July 2006 and 14 May 2007.

New professional players
Countries
 
 
 
 
 
 
 
 
 
 

Note: New means in these case, that these players were not on the 2005/2006 professional Main Tour.

International champions 

NGB nominations

From PIOS Tour

Calendar
The following table outlines the results and dates for all the ranking and major invitational events.

Official rankings 

The top 16 of the world rankings, these players automatically played in the final rounds of the world ranking events and were invited for the Masters.

World ranking points

Points distribution 
2006/2007 Points distribution for world ranking events:

Notes

References

External links

2006
Season 2007
Season 2006